The El-Ad Group is an Israel-based American real estate development company. The group controls many subsidiaries including Elad Properties, which is based in New York City, Elad Florida and El-Ad Canada, which is based in Toronto, Ontario.

Collectively, the El-Ad Group owns many landmarks across North America, including the historic Plaza Hotel, The Grand Madison and the Metropolitan Life Insurance Company Tower in New York City. The El-Ad Group is owned by Yitzhak Tshuva, an Israeli businessman.

In May 2007, Elad Properties purchased the New Frontier Hotel and Casino in Las Vegas, Nevada for $1.2 billion. The project went bankrupt, and was halted indefinitely.

Subsidiaries

Middle East
Elad Hotels Ltd. took a controlling interest in the 6-hotel Sheraton Moriah Israel hotel chain.

North America
Elad Properties is a real estate developer based in New York City, with extensive holdings in the United States, primarily New York City. The flagship property of Elad Properties, New York, is the Plaza Hotel on Central Park South, bought by ElAd affiliate CPS One LLC, and reopened  March 1, 2008. ElAd Properties is run by CEO Udi Erez.

Established in 2004 to spearhead expansion into the southeast, El Ad National Properties began as an affiliation between El Ad Group Florida and El Ad Group Canada, and today runs properties in ten states with a focus on the south, the Midwest and northeastern United States. 55% of Elad National Properties' portfolio are rentals. Through a joint venture, El Ad National Properties controls Element National Management, a property management company.

In 2007, the company expanded its holding in Los Angeles, purchasing land between Beverly Hills and Westwood as part of a $330 million development deal.

Miki Naftali, the former CEO, launched and guided Elad’s successful New York operation and its expansion across the country and around the globe.
The highlight of Elad’s portfolio is New York’s Plaza Hotel. The storied landmark has undergone a $450 million renovation. Elad will also be expanding The Plaza brand to cities around the world, including Boston, Los Angeles, Paris, London, Tokyo and Shanghai.
Naftali is developing the last high-rise luxury condo on the Wilshire Corridor in Los Angeles and is planning a luxury high-rise in New York City designed by Daniel Libeskind. He is leading Elad into Singapore by creating a major residential, commercial, retail and hotel complex designed by Sir Norman Foster. 
Naftali also oversees Elad’s activities in other premier North American markets. Elad National has a growing presence in Florida, Texas, Maryland, North Carolina, South Carolina, Georgia, Michigan, Illinois, Indiana and Massachusetts.

Far East
ElAd Group runs several joint ventures with local companies in India and Singapore. In 2007, Elad Far East was established via a partnership deal with China's Zeg Investments.

Controversies
Elad's purchase of New York City's Plaza Hotel caused great controversy in 2004. But as the hotel was readied for opening on March 1, 2008, The New York Times observed, Tshuva and Peter Ward, president of the New York's hotel workers' union, had reconciled their differences: "It was a big change from early 2005, when Mr. Ward vowed to block Mr. Tshuva's plans to convert most of the hotel into luxury condos and reconfigure some of its Edwardian public spaces into upscale shops, moves he contended would force union members out of work".

On May 15, 2007, the company announced plans to purchase the New Frontier Hotel and Casino on the Las Vegas Strip in Las Vegas, Nevada, with plans to raze the current structure and build a new resort to be branded as Las Vegas Plaza. It sold for a record $33 million per acre.

In August 2007, Elad Properties faced a lawsuit between itself and the Plaza Hotel & Casino owner, Tamares Group.

Holdings 
 Plaza Hotel
 O'Neill Building
 The Grand Madison
 21 Astor Place
 The Link REIT
 New Frontier Hotel and Casino
 Metropolitan Life Insurance Company Tower

References 

Financial services companies of Israel
Filling stations in Israel
Israeli brands
Real estate companies of Israel
Oil and gas companies of Israel